Pierre de La Montagne (1755, Langon – c. 1825) was an 18th–19th-century French playwright, poet and translator.

From his youth, La Montagne showed a happy disposition for poetry and published his first essays in periodicals. In 1773, he addressed Stances à Voltaire malade. He also translated from English and Greek into French.

Works 
1791: Arabelle et Altamont, three-act tragedy, in verse. Paris, Creuze et comp., in-8°. (The subject of this tragedy is drawn from The New Heloise by J.-J. Rousseau.)
1808: La Bataille de Marengo, ode, Paris, S. A. Hugclet, October, in-8° de 16 p.
1801: Discours prononcé dans la cérémonie de la translation des cendres de Michel Montaigne, le prem. vendémiaire an IX., Bordeaux, in-8°.
1785: L’Enthousiaste, two-act comedy in verse, followed by Poésies fugitives, Paris, by the author, in-8°.
 Épitre à Grétry, in-8°.
1807: Épitre aux députés français, professant la religion juive, convoqués à Paris en grand Sanhédrin, Paris, Allut, in-8°, 8 pages.
1824: Le Hylozoïsme, ou la Matière animée, ode, Paris, by the author, in-8°, 12 pages.
1822: Laure et Pétrarque, églogue héroïque ; followed by Stances à M. Ch. Pougens, Paris, by the author, in-8°, 16 pages. (The author, in a note, argues, without evidence and without foundation, that Laura de Noves was never married, that she always lived in Vaucluse where she was born and where she died, that we do not know her family, etc.)
1782: La Lévite conquise, poem in two songs, Amsterdam and Paris, Vve Ballard et fils, in-8°, 20 pages.
1816: La Mort, ode philosophique, Paris, Hugelet, in-8°, 16 pages.
1786: Les Nouvellistes, comedy in i act and in verse. Bordeaux, frères Labottière, in-8°. (Reprinted under the title Café de Rouen, Paris, Poinçot, 1786, in-8°.)
1814: Les Oreilles d’âne, tale, Paris, de l’imp. de Sétier, in-8°, 8 pages.
1796: Papelard, ou le Tartuffe philosophe et politique, comedy in 5 acts and in verse, de l’impr. du Cercle social, an IV, in-8°.
1781: La Physicienne, comedy in 1 act and in verse. Paris, Poincot, in-8°.
1789: Poésies diverses, Paris, Knayen, in-8°. (This volume contains a number of the author's youth plays.)
1810: Les Saints Stigmates, ode. Paris, de l’imp. de S. A. Hugelet, in-8°, 16 p.
1783: La Théatromanie, comedy in two acts and in verse. Amsterdam and Paris, Cailleau, in-8°.
1818: La Transfiguration par Raphaël, ode, Paris, l’Auteur ; Hugelet, in-8°, 16 p.
1805: La Vestale, poème en IV chants, Paris, F. Cocheris fils, in-12, 35 p.

Translations 
1788: La Visite d’été, by Clower ;
1789: Cornelia Sedley, anonymous ;
1791: De l’influence des passions sur les maladies du corps, by Falcomneu ;
1791: Lettres écrites de France à une amie d’Angleterre, by miss Williams ;
1791: Mémoires sur l’Inde, by Hastings ;
1795: Le Banquet de Xénophon, transl. from Greek and added to Life of Xenophon, by M. Fortia d’Urban, in-8° ;
1796: Klbelinde, ou la Recluse du lac, by Ch. Smith ;
1808: L’Histoire d’Irlande'', by Gordon.

Sources 
 .

External links 
 Pierre de la Montagne on data.bnf.fr

1755 births
1820s deaths
18th-century French dramatists and playwrights
18th-century French poets
18th-century French male writers
French translators
English–French translators
Greek–French translators
People from Langon, Gironde